Taşbaşı is a neighbourhood in the İspir District of Erzurum Province in Turkey.

References

Villages in İspir District